The Waynoka Santa Fe Depot and Harvey House in Waynoka, Oklahoma are substantial brick buildings from 1910 built for the Atchison, Topeka and Santa Fe Railway ("Santa Fe"). The Harvey House operated from 1910 to 1937, and was renovated to serve as a dormitory and reading room for train crewmen. The Depot was a stop for the San Francisco Chief. It was listed on the National Register of Historic Places listings in Woods County, Oklahoma in 1974.

The Harvey House building is H-shaped in plan.

References

Railway stations on the National Register of Historic Places in Oklahoma
Fred Harvey Company
National Register of Historic Places in Woods County, Oklahoma
Railway stations in the United States opened in 1910
Atchison, Topeka and Santa Fe Railway stations
Former railway stations in Oklahoma